Artificial intelligence is used in Wikipedia and other Wikimedia projects for the purpose of developing those projects. Human and bot interaction in Wikimedia projects is routine and iterative.

Using artificial intelligence for Wikimedia projects
Various projects seek to improve Wikipedia and Wikimedia projects by using artificial intelligence tools.

ORES
The Objective Revision Evaluation Service (ORES) project is an artificial intelligence service for grading the quality of Wikipedia edits. The Wikimedia Foundation presented the ORES project in November 2015.

Detox
Detox is a project to prevent users from posting unkind comments in Wikimedia community discussions. Among other parts of the Detox project, the Wikimedia Foundation and Jigsaw collaborated to use artificial intelligence for basic research and to develop technical solutions to address the problem. In October 2016 those organizations published "Ex Machina: Personal Attacks Seen at Scale" describing their findings. Various popular media outlets reported on the publication of this paper and described the social context of the research.

Other
In August 2018, a company called Primer reported attempting to use artificial intelligence to create Wikipedia articles about women as a way to address gender bias on Wikipedia.

In 2022, the public release of ChatGPT inspired more experimentation with AI and writing Wikipedia articles.

Using Wikimedia projects for artificial intelligence
Content in Wikimedia projects is useful as a dataset in advancing artificial intelligence research and applications. For instance, in the development of the Google's Perspective API that identifies toxic comments in online forums, a dataset containing hundreds of thousands of Wikipedia talk page comments with human-labelled toxicity levels was used.

A 2012 paper reported that more than 1000 academic articles, including those using artificial intelligence, examine Wikipedia, reuse information from Wikipedia, use technical extensions linked to Wikipedia, or research communication about Wikipedia. A 2017 paper described Wikipedia as the mother lode for human-generated text available for machine learning.

A 2016 research project called "One Hundred Year Study on Artificial Intelligence" named Wikipedia as a key early project for understanding the interplay between artificial intelligence applications and human engagement.

References

See also
ORES Mediawiki page
 Wikipedia:Artificial intelligence

AI software
Wikimedia projects
Commercial use of Wikimedia projects